Dr. Thomas Chalmers Robertson (15 September 1907 – 11 January 1989) was a writer, ecologist and conservationist from South Africa. He was also a war correspondent, and Jan Smuts’s anti-Nazi propagandist during World War II. He was driven by three things: his mission to save the soil (and grasses of Southern Africa), his insatiable quest for knowledge (being regarded by some as a genius), and his equally insatiable hedonism.

The T.C.Robertson Nature Reserve situated on the outskirts of the town of Scottburgh, KwaZulu-Natal is named after him, and he played a role in the development of Ilanda Wilds (a nature reserve in Amanzimtoti to the north of Scottburgh).

According to Dictionary.com, Robertson coined the term "white nationalism" in his 1948 essay titled Racism Comes to Power in South Africa: The Threat of White Nationalism. However, Merriam-Webster has noted usage of the two-word phrase as early as 1925.

References

South African journalists
South African naturalists
1907 births
1989 deaths
South African ecologists
20th-century journalists
20th-century naturalists
South African people of World War II